Can't Say may refer to:

 "Can't Say", song by Travis Scott from album Astroworld
 "Can't Say", song by Imelda May from album 11 Past the Hour

See also 
 Can't Say No (disambiguation)